Ed Stradling (born 1972 in Cardiff, Wales), is a TV producer/director, who is best known for producing documentaries accompanying the BBC DVD range in the 2000s.

Documentaries 

Stradling produced over 40 documentaries and shorts on DVD releases of various TV shows, most notably Doctor Who, also Robin of Sherwood, and with Sir David Attenborough on Civilisation: A Personal View and The Ascent of Man.

In the 2010s he worked on Children's BBC programming, directed Danny Baker's Christmas Hits, as well as music documentaries for the Sky Arts Channel. He has since worked on political and royal programming for Channel 5 & ITV, including General Election specials for ITV's Tonight programme.

He is also a television archivist and runs The TV Museum youtube channel.

References

BBC Doctor Who Website

British television producers
Mass media people from Cardiff
1972 births
Living people